The first elections to Kesteven County Council were held on Thursday, 17 January 1889. Kesteven was one of three divisions of the historic county of Lincolnshire in England; it consisted of the ancient wapentakes (or hundreds) of Aswardhurn, Aveland, Beltisloe, Boothby Graffoe, Flaxwell, Langoe, Loveden, Ness, and Winnibriggs and Threo. The Local Government Act 1888 established Kesteven as an administrative county, governed by a Council; elections were held every three years from 1889, until it was abolished by the Local Government Act 1972, which established Lincolnshire County Council in its place.

The forty-six electoral divisions of the new Council were outlined in December 1888. All but two returned one candidate: Sleaford and Quarrington and Bourne and Morton returned two each. The town of Grantham was represented across seven divisions, while Stamford had four. Twenty-one candidates (including both for Sleaford) were returned unopposed. The remainder were informed of the result on the day after polling. Votes were counted in one of the court rooms in Lincoln; the Sheriff of Lincolnshire, A. S. Leslie-Melville, was the presiding officer, while R. A. Stephens was his deputy for Kesteven.

Results by division

Ancaster

Barrowby

Bassingham

Bennington

Billingborough

Billinghay

Bourne and Morton

= Two seats

Bracebridge

Branston

Bytham

Caythorpe

Claypole

Colsterworth

Corby

Deeping

Gonerby

Grantham no. 1

Grantham no. 2

Grantham no. 3

Grantham no. 4

Grantham no. 5

Grantham no. 6

Grantham no. 7

Heckington

Heighington

Helpringham

Kyme

Martin

Metheringham

Navenby

Osbournby

Ponton

Rippingale

Ropsley

Ruskington

Skellingthorpe

Sleaford and Quarrington

 = Two seats

Stamford (All Saints)

Stamford (St George's)

Stamford (St Michael's and St John's)

Stamford (St Martin's and St Mary's)

Thurlby

Uffington

Waddington

Wellingore

Wilsford

By-elections in February 1889

The Council held its first meeting on 31 January, where it elected a Chairman and sixteen aldermen. If a councillor were elected an alderman, he had to forfeit his seat. Eleven members of the Council were elected to the aldermanic bench, which meant that their seats became vacant, triggering by-elections. Colonel Willson, who had been returned for Wilsford at the first round of elections, was disqualified because he held a paid commission in the armed forces; this triggered a by-election. All twelve were held on 18 February; four candidates stood unopposed.

Grantham no. 2

Barrowby

Ponton

Corby

Sleaford

Wilsford

Bourne

Helpringham

Billingborough

Branston

Billinghay

Wellingore

References

1889
Kesteven
19th century in Lincolnshire
January 1889 events